Numerous castles are found in the German state of Bavaria. These buildings, some of which have a history of over 1,000 years, were the setting for historical events, domains of famous personalities, and are still imposing structures to this day.

This list encompasses castles described in German as Burg (castle), Festung (fort/fortress), Schloss (manor house) and Palais/Palast (palace). Many German castles after the Middle Ages were built mainly as royal or noble residences rather than as fortified buildings.

Regierungsbezirk Oberbayern

Altötting 

 Burghausen Castle (in German)
 Castle Tuessling (in German)

Bad Tölz-Wolfratshausen 

 Seeburg (Münsing)
 Schloss Hohenburg
 Hohenburg (Lenggries) (ruin)

Berchtesgadener Land 

 Berchtesgaden Castle (de)
 Gruttenstein Castle (de)
 Burgruine Karlstein (de)
 Castle Laufen
 Marzoll Palace (de)
 Raschenberg Castle (de)
 Staufeneck Castle (de)

Dachau 

 Dachau Palace
 Schloss Haimhausen
 Unterweikertshofen Castle (in German)
 Schloss Lauterbach

Ebersberg 

 Burg Unterelkofen, Grafing b. München

Eichstätt 

 Altmannstein Castle, Altmannstein
 Arnsberg Castle, Kipfenberg
 Brunneck Castle, Titting
 Dollnstein Castle, Dollnstein
 Residenz Eichstätt, Eichstätt
 Sommerresidenz Eichstätt, Eichstätt
 Schloss Hepberg, Hepberg
 Schloss Hexenagger, Altmannstein
 Schloss Hirschberg, Beilngries
 Kirchenburg Kinding, Kinding
 Kipfenberg Castle, Kipfenberg
 Schloss Lenting, Lenting
 Mörnsheim Castle, Mörnsheim
 Nassenfels Castle, Nassenfels
 Schloss Oberdolling, Oberdolling
 Pfalzpaint Castle, Walting
 Schloss Pfünz, Walting
 Rieshofen Castle, Walting
 Rumburg Castle, Kinding
 Rundeck Castle, Kinding
 Schloss Sandersdorf, Altmannstein
 Schloss Schönbrunn, Denkendorf
 Schloss Titting, Titting
 Wellheim Castle, Wellheim
 Willibaldsburg, Eichstätt

Erding 

 Schloss Burgrein, Isen

Garmisch-Partenkirchen 

 Königshaus am Schachen
 Schloss Linderhof, Ettal
 Werdenfels Castle, Garmisch-Partenkirchen

Ingolstadt 

 Neues Schloss Ingolstadt (in German)

Landsberg 

 Damasia, Dießen am Ammersee
 Phetine, Landsberg am Lech
 Schloss Igling, Igling

Mühldorf 

 Schloss Jettenbach, Jettenbach
 Schloss Klebing, Pleiskirchen

Munich 

 Alter Hof
 Amalienburg
 Blutenburg
 Nymphenburg
 Residenz
 Fürstenried

Munich (district) 

 Grünwald Castle, Grünwald
 Schleissheim Palace, Oberschleißheim

Neuburg-Schrobenhausen 

 Alte Burg, Oberhausen
 Schloss Bertoldsheim, Rennertshofen
 Grünau Hunting Lodge, Neuburg an der Donau
 Hütting Castle, Rennertshofen
 Schloss Neuburg, Neuburg an der Donau
 Sandizell Castle, Schrobenhausen
 Schloss Stepperg, Rennertshofen

Pfaffenhofen 

 Schloss Jetzendorf, Jetzendorf
 Schloss Reichertshausen, Reichertshausen
 Schloss Rohrbach, Rohrbach (Oberbayern)
 Scheyern Castle, Scheyern
 Vohburg Castle, Vohburg an der Donau

Rosenheim 

 Schloss Herrenchiemsee, Chiemsee
 Wasserburg Castle, Wasserburg am Inn
 Hofberg, Bad Aibling
 Schloss Amerang, Amerang
 Schloss Maxlrain, Maxlrain
 Schloss Altenburg, Altenburg
 Schloss Vagen, Vagen

Starnberg 

 Schloss Allmannshausen, Berg
 Schloss Berg, Berg
 Schloss Kempfenhausen, Berg

Traunstein 

 Stein Castle, Stein an der Traun
 Tittmoning Castle, Tittmoning

Regierungsbezirk Niederbayern

Landshut 
 Trausnitz Castle
 Landshut Residence
 Burgruine Wolfstein

Passau 

 Alte Residenz Passau
 Neue Residenz Passau
 Residenz (Passau)
 Schloss Eggendobl
 Schloss Freudenhain
 Veste Niederhaus
 Veste Oberhaus

Landkreis Freyung-Grafenau 
 Saldenburg, Saldenburg

Landkreis Kelheim 

 Burg Eggersberg, Riedenburg
 Burg Prunn, Riedenburg
 Burgruine Rabenstein, Riedenburg
 Burg Randeck, Essing
 Schloss Rosenburg, Riedenburg
 Burgruine Tachenstein, Riedenburg
 Schloss Train, Train
 Schloss Wildenberg, Wildenberg

Landkreis Passau 
 Ruine Altjochenstein, Untergriesbach
 Englburg, Tittling
 Schloss Neuburg am Inn, Neuburg am Inn
 Schloss Neuhaus am Inn, Neuhaus am Inn
 Schloss Obernzell, Obernzell
 Schloss Ortenburg, Ortenburg

Landkreis Regen 
 Burg Altnußberg, Geiersthal
 Burg Neunußberg, Viechtach
 Burg Weißenstein, Regen

Landkreis Rottal-Inn 
 Oberes Schloss Arnstorf, Arnstorf
 Unteres Schloss Arnstorf, Arnstorf
 Schloss Ering, Ering
 Schloss Mariakirchen, Arnstorf
 Schloss Münchsdorf, Roßbach
 Schloss Schönau, Schönau
 Schloss Thurnstein, Postmünster

Landkreis Straubing-Bogen 
 Burg Neurandsberg, Rattenberg

Regierungsbezirk Oberpfalz

Amberg 
 Kurfürstliches Schloss

Regensburg 
 Schloss Thurn und Taxis

Landkreis Amberg-Sulzbach 
 Burg Dagestein, Vilseck
 Burg Heimhof, Ursensollen
 Burgruine Hohenburg, Hohenburg
 Klosterburg Kastl, Kastl
 Burgruine Lichtenegg, Birgland
 Burgruine Pfaffenhofen (Schweppermannsburg), Kastl
 Schloss Sulzbach, Sulzbach-Rosenberg
 Schloss Schmidmühlen, Schmidmühlen
 Hammerherrenschloss Theuern, Schloss Theuern, Kümmersbruck
 Burgruine Poppberg, Birgland

Landkreis Cham 
 Burgruine Chameregg, Cham
 Burg Falkenstein, Falkenstein
 Burgruine Kürnberg, Stamsried
 Burgruine Runding, Runding
 Burg Schwärzenberg, Roding
 Burg Schwarzenburg, Rötz
 Schloss Altrandsberg, Miltach
 Schloss Miltach, Miltach
 Schloss Thierlstein, Cham
 Schloss Zandt, Blaibach

Landkreis Neumarkt in der Oberpfalz 
 Burgruine Adelburg, Seubersdorf in der Oberpfalz
 Burgruine Breitenegg, Breitenbrunn 
 Deutschordensschloss, Postbauer-Heng
 Burgruine Haimburg, Berg bei Neumarkt in der Oberpfalz 
 Burgruine Heinrichsbürg (Heinzburg), Neumarkt in der Oberpfalz
 Burgruine Helfenberg, Velburg
 Burgruine Hohenfels, Hohenfels
 Schloss Jettenhofen, Freystadt
 Burg Lupburg, Lupburg
 Burgruine Lutzmannstein, Velburg
 Pfalzgrafenschloss Neumarkt, Neumarkt in der Oberpfalz
 Burgruine Niedersulzbürg, Mühlhausen
 Burgruine Obersulzbürg, Mühlhausen
 Burg Parsberg, Parsberg
 Schloss Pilsach, Pilsach
 Schloss Rohrenstadt, Berg bei Neumarkt in der Oberpfalz
 Schlossruine Pyrbaum, Pyrbaum
 Schloss Töging, Dietfurt an der Altmühl
 Burgruine Velburg, Velburg
 Burgruine Wildenstein, Dietfurt an der Altmühl
 Schloss Woffenbach, Neumarkt in der Oberpfalz 
 Wolfstein Castle, Neumarkt in der Oberpfalz

Landkreis Neustadt an der Waldnaab 
 Schloss Burgtreswitz, Moosbach
 Flossenbürg Castle, Flossenbürg
 Schloss Friedrichsburg, Vohenstrauß
 Leuchtenberg Castle, Leuchtenberg
 Neuhaus Castle, Windischeschenbach
 Hammerschloss Röthenbach, Kohlberg
 Altes Schloss, Neustadt an der Waldnaab
 Neues Schloss, Neustadt an der Waldnaab
 Parkstein Castle, Parkstein
 Schellenberg Castle, Georgenberg

Landkreis Regensburg 
 Schloss Alteglofsheim, Alteglofsheim
 Donaustauf Castle, Donaustauf
 Ehrenfels Castle, Beratzhausen
 Schloss Etterzhausen, Nittendorf
 Forstenberg Castle, Regenstauf OT Ramspau/Karlstein
 Schloss Höfling
 Kallmünz Castle, Kallmünz
 Schloss Karlstein, Regenstauf OT Karlstein
 Laaber Castle, Laaber
 Schloss Ramspau, Regenstauf OT Ramspau
 Schloss Sünching, Sünching
 Schloss Wörth, Wörth an der Donau
 Wolfsegg Castle, Wolfsegg

Landkreis Schwandorf 
 Burg Frauenstein, Winklarn
 Schloss Fronberg, Schwandorf
 Burgruine Haus Murach, Oberviechtach
 Burg Lengenfeld, Burglengenfeld
 Schloss Münchshofen, Teublitz
 Burgruine Stockenfels, Nittenau
 Schloss Teublitz, Teublitz
 Burg Wernberg, Wernberg-Köblitz

Landkreis Tirschenreuth 
 Altenstädter Schloss, Erbendorf
 Burg Falkenberg, Falkenberg
 Schloss Friedenfels, Friedenfels
 Schloss Grötschenreuth, Erbendorf
 Schloss Hardeck, Bad Neualbenreuth
 Burgruine Liebenstein, Plößberg
 Schloss Ottengrün, Bad Neualbenreuth
 Schloss Reuth, Reuth b. Erbendorf
 Schloss Thumsenreuth, Krummennaab
 Burg Trautenberg, Krummennaab
 Burgruine Waldeck, Kemnath
 Schloss Waldershof, Waldershof
 Burgruine Weißenstein, Waldershof
 Schloss Wildenau, Plößberg
 Schloss Wildenreuth, Erbendorf
 Schloss Wolframshof, Kastl

Regierungsbezirk Oberfranken

Bamberg 
 Altenburg
 Neue Residenz (Bamberg)

Bayreuth 
 Eremitage

Coburg 

 Bürglaß-Schlösschen
 Schloss Callenberg
 Edinburgh-Palais
 Schloss Ehrenburg
 Schloss Eichhof
 Schloss Falkenegg
 Schloss Hohenfels
 Schloss Ketschendorf
 Schloss Neuhof
 Rosenauer Burg
 Veste Coburg

Landkreis Bamberg 

 Giech Castle, Scheßlitz
 Schloss Greifenstein, Heiligenstadt in Oberfranken
 Lisberg Castle, Lisberg
 Schloss Seehof, Memmelsdorf
 Wasserschloss Thüngfeld, Schlüsselfeld
 Schloss Weißenstein, Pommersfelden
 Schloss Wernsdorf, Strullendorf

Landkreis Bayreuth 

 Schloss Fantaisie, Eckersdorf
 Schloss Freienfels, Hollfeld
 Hohenberneck Castle, Bad Berneck im Fichtelgebirge 
 Krögelstein Castle, Hollfeld
 Leienfels Castle, Pottenstein
 Lower Tüchersfeld Castle,  Tüchersfeld
 Neidenstein Castle, Hollfeld
 Schloss Oberaufseß, Aufseß
 Schloss Unteraufseß, Aufseß
 Schloss Plankenfels, Plankenfels
 Pottenstein Castle, Pottenstein
 Rabeneck Castle, Waischenfeld
 Rabenstein Castle, Ahorntal
 Burgstall Schlosshügel, Weidenberg
 Stein Castle, Gefrees
 Schloss Trockau, Pegnitz
 Upper Tüchersfeld Castle, Tüchersfeld
 Wadendorf Castle, Plankenfels
 Waischenfeld Castle, Waischenfeld
 Wallenrode Castle, Bad Berneck im Fichtelgebirge
 Walpotenburg Castle, Bad Berneck im Fichtelgebirge

Landkreis Coburg 
 Schloss Ahorn, Ahorn
 Schloss Hohenstein, Ahorn
 Schloss Lahm, Lahm/Itzgrund 
 Schloss Moggenbrunn, Meeder
 Schloss Rosenau, Rödental
 Schloss Tambach, Weitramsdorf

Landkreis Forchheim 
 Bärnfels Castle ruins, Obertrubach
 Egloffstein Castle, Egloffstein
 Gaillenreuth Castle, Ebermannstadt
 Gößweinstein Castle, Gößweinstein
 Hiltpoltstein Castle, Hiltpoltstein
 Kohlstein Castle, Gößweinstein
 Schloss Kunreuth, Kunreuth
 Neideck Castle, Streitberg
 Regensberg Castle ruins, Kunreuth
 Streitburg Castle ruins, Wiesenttal
 Thuisbrunn Castle, Gräfenberg
 Schloss Thurn, Heroldsbach
 Schloss Wiesenthau, Wiesenthau
 Wolfsberg Castle ruins, Obertrubach
 Wolkenstein Castle, Ebermannstadt

Landkreis Hof 
 Lichtenberg Castle, Lichtenberg
 Schloss Reitzenstein

Landkreis Kronach 
 Oberes Schloss Friesen, Kronach
 Unteres Schloss Friesen, Kronach
 Schloss Haig, Stockheim
 Schloss Hain, Küps
 Hinteres (Neues) Schloss Küps, Küps
 Mittleres (Altes) Schloss Küps, Küps
 Oberes Schloss Küps, Küps
 Burg Lauenstein, Ludwigsstadt
 Oberes Schloss Mitwitz, Mitwitz
 Unteres Schloss Mitwitz, Mitwitz
 Schloss Nagel, Küps
 Schloss Oberlangenstadt, Küps
 Festung Rosenberg, Kronach
 Heunischenburg bei Gehülz, Kronach
 Schlossruine Rothenkirchen, Pressig
 Schloss Schmölz, Küps
 Schloss Stockheim, Stockheim
 Schloss Theisenort, Küps

Landkreis Kulmbach 
 Plassenburg, Kulmbach 
 Schloss Thurnau, Thurnau
 Burg Wernstein, Mainleus
 Burg Wildenstein, Presseck
 Burg Zwernitz und Felsengarten Sanspareil, Wonsees

Landkreis Lichtenfels 
 Schloss Banz, Bad Staffelstein

Landkreis Wunsiedel im Fichtelgebirge 
 Schloss Alexandersbad, Bad Alexandersbad
 Schloss Brand, Marktredwitz
 Epprechtstein Castle
 The ruins of Hirschstein Castle on the Großer Kornberg in the Fichtel Mountains
 , Hohenberg an der Eger
 Kaiserhammer hunting lodge, Marktleuthen
 The ruins of the Luxburg on the Luisenburg in the Fichtel Mountains
 Röthenbach Castle, Arzberg
 Castle ruins and palace of Neuhaus a. d. Eger, town of Hohenberg an der Eger
 The castle on the Rudolfstein near Weißenstadt
 Thierstein Castle, Thierstein
 The castles on the Waldstein

Regierungsbezirk Mittelfranken

Ansbach 
 Residenz Ansbach

Erlangen 
 ehemaliges Schlösschen Bruck (Herrensitz)
 Markgräfliches Schloss Erlangen
 Schloss Tennenlohe

Fürth 
 Schloss Burgfarrnbach
 Schloss Steinach
 ehemaliges Wasserschloss Vach (Herrensitz)

Nürnberg 

 Nürnberger Burg
 City walls of Nuremberg
 Burgen, Schlösser und Herrensitze im Stadtgebiet Nürnberg

Schwabach 
 ehemaliges Wasserschloss Wolkersdorf (Herrensitz)

Landkreis Ansbach 

 Schloss Bruckberg, Bruckberg
 Colmberg Castle, Colmberg
 Schloss Dennenlohe, Unterschwaningen
 Deutschordensschloss Dinkelsbühl, Dinkelsbühl
 Schloss Dürrwangen, Dürrwangen
 Schloss Habelsee, Ohrenbach
 Herrieden Castle, Herrieden
 Lehrberg Castle, Lehrberg
 Leonrod Castle, Dietenhofen
 Lichtenau Fortress, Lichtenau
 Schloss Neuendettelsau, Neuendettelsau
 Ruine Rosenberg, Rügland
 Schloss Rügland, Rügland
 Schloss Schillingsfürst, Schillingsfürst
 Schloss Sommersdorf, Burgoberbach
 Topplerschlösschen, Rothenburg ob der Tauber
 Schloss Triesdorf, Weidenbach
 Schloss Unterschwaningen, Unterschwaningen
 Virnsberg Castle, Flachslanden
 Wahrberg Castle, Aurach
 Schloss Wassertrüdingen, Wassertrüdingen
 Schloss Windelsbach, Windelsbach
 Vogteischloss Wolframs-Eschenbach, Wolframs-Eschenbach

Landkreis Erlangen-Höchstadt 

 Schloss Adelsdorf, Adelsdorf
 Schloss Hemhofen, Hemhofen
 Schloss Herzogenaurach, Herzogenaurach
 Schloss Höchstadt, Höchstadt an der Aisch
 Schloss Neuenbürg, Weisendorf
 Schloss Neuhaus, Adelsdorf
 Schloss Weingartsgreuth, Wachenroth
 Schloss Weisendorf, Weisendorf

Landkreis Fürth 

 Cadolzburg, Cadolzburg
 Faberschloss, Stein

Landkreis Neustadt an der Aisch-Bad Windsheim 
 Schloss Breitenlohe, Breitenlohe
 Burg Hoheneck, Ipsheim
 Schloss Obernzenn, Obernzenn
 Schloss Schwarzenberg, Scheinfeld
 Schloss Trautskirchen, Trautskirchen
 Schloss Unternzenn, Obernzenn

Landkreis Nürnberger Land 

 Pflegschloss Altdorf, Altdorf bei Nürnberg
 Schloss Artelshofen, Vorra
 Ruine Burgthann, Burgthann
 Schloss Eschenbach, Pommelsbrunn
 Burgruine Lichtenstein, Pommelsbrunn
 Schloss Grünsberg, Altdorf bei Nürnberg
 Burg Hartenstein, Hartenstein
 Schloss Hersbruck, Hersbruck
 Burg Hohenstein, Kirchensittenbach
 Schloss Kirchensittenbach, Kirchensittenbach
 Wasserburg Malmsbach, Schwaig bei Nürnberg
 Burg Osternohe, Schnaittach
 Schloss Reichenschwand, Reichenschwand
 Rothenberg Fortress, Schnaittach
 Thann Castle, Burgthann
 Tucherschloss, Simmelsdorf
 Schloss Utzmannsbach, Simmelsdorf
 Burg Veldenstein, Neuhaus an der Pegnitz
 Wenzelschloss, Lauf an der Pegnitz
 Burg Wildenfels, Simmelsdorf

Landkreis Roth 
 Burg Abenberg, Stadt Abenberg
 Burgstall Allersberg, Markt Allersberg
 Schlösschen Appelhof, Markt Allersberg
 Schloss Greding, Stadt Greding
 Burgruine Hofberg, Stadt Greding
 Bleymerschlösschen bei Kraftsbuch, Stadt Greding
 Burgstall Altenheideck, Stadt Heideck
 Burgstall Fäßleinsberg, Stadt Hilpoltstein
 Burgruine Hilpoltstein, Stadt Hilpoltstein
 Residenz Hilpoltstein, Stadt Hilpoltstein
 Burgstall Hinterhausen/Schlossberg, Stadt Heideck
 Schloss Kreuth, Stadt Heideck
 Wehrkirche Mindorf, Stadt Hilpoltstein
 Burgstall Meckenhausen, Stadt Hilpoltstein
 Burgstall Mörlach (Minettenheim), Stadt Hilpoltstein
 Schlösschen Mörlach, Stadt Hilpoltstein
 Burgstall Oberrödel, Stadt Hilpoltstein
 Wasserschloss Zell, Stadt Hilpoltstein
 Markgrafenschloss Ratibor, Stadt Roth
 Seckendorffschlösschen in Roth, Stadt Roth
 Burgstall Wartstein, Stadt Roth
 Burgstall Aue,  Markt Thalmässing
 Burgstall "Burschl" bei Aue,  Markt Thalmässing
 Niederungsburg/Markgrafenschloss Eysölden,  Markt Thalmässing
 Wehrkirche Eysölden,  Markt Thalmässing
 Schlösschen Gebersdorf,  Markt Thalmässing
 Burgstall Landeck,  Markt Thalmässing
 Burgstall "Alter Berg" bei Stauf, Markt Thalmässing
 Burgruine Stauff, Markt Thalmässing
 Burg Wernfels, Stadt Spalt
 Schlösschen in Enderndorf, Stadt Spalt
 Schlösschen Untererlbach, Stadt Spalt
 Schloss Kugelhammer
 Schloss Dürrenmungenau
 Burgstall Harrlach

Landkreis Weißenburg-Gunzenhausen 

 Schloss Absberg, Absberg
 Schloss Altenmuhr, Muhr am See
 Burg Bechthal, Raitenbuch
 Schloss Cronheim, Gunzenhausen
 Ellingen Residence, Ellingen
 Schloss Geyern, Bergen
 Burg Pappenheim, Pappenheim
 Schloss Sandsee, Pleinfeld
 Schloss Spielberg, Gnotzheim
 Schloss Stopfenheim, Ellingen
 Schloss Syburg, Bergen
 Schloss Wald, Gunzenhausen
 Festung Wülzburg, Weißenburg in Bayern

Regierungsbezirk Unterfranken

Aschaffenburg
 Schloss Johannisburg
 Schloss Schönbusch

Würzburg

 Feste Marienberg, Würzburg
 Würzburger Residenz

Landkreis Aschaffenburg

 Burg Alzenau, Alzenau
 Schloss Mespelbrunn, Mespelbrunn
 Schloss Luitpoldshöhe, gemeindefreies Gebiet Rohrbrunner Forst

Landkreis Bad Kissingen

 Schloss Aschach, Bad Bocklet
 Burgruine Botenlauben, Bad Kissingen
 Kellereischloss, Hammelburg
 Kirchenburg, Fuchsstadt
 Burg Saaleck, Hammelburg
 Burg Trimberg, Elfershausen

Landkreis Haßberge

 Altenstein Castle, Maroldsweisach
 Bramberg Castle, Ebern
 Schloss Eyrichshof, Ebern
 Schloss Fischbach, Ebern
 Konigsberg Castle, Königsberg in Bayern
 Lichtenstein Castle, Pfarrweisach
 Rauheneck Castle, Ebern
 Rotenhan Castle, Ebern
 Schmachtenberg Castle, Zeil am Main
 Schloss Wonfurt, Wonfurt

Landkreis Kitzingen
 Schloss Altenschönbach, Prichsenstadt
 Johanniterkastell, Biebelried
 Schloss Biebergau, Dettelbach
 Schloss Bimbach, Prichsenstadt
 Schloss Castell, Castell
 Schloss Einersheim, Markt Einersheim
 Schloss Friedrichsberg, Abtswind
 Gräflich Schönborn'sches Schloss, Volkach
 Schloss Fröhstockheim, Rödelsee
 Schloss Mainsondheim, Dettelbach
 Schloss Rödelsee, Rödelsee
 Schloss Rüdenhausen, Rüdenhausen
 Schloss Schwanberg, Rödelsee
 Gräfliches Schloss Wiesentheid, Wiesentheid

Landkreis Main-Spessart

 Kirchenburg Aschfeld, Eußenheim
 Schloss Büchold, Arnstein
 Schloss Homburg, Triefenstein
 Homburg, Gössenheim
 Karlsburg, Karlstadt
 Lohrer Schloss, Lohr am Main
 Burg Rieneck, Rieneck
 Schloss Rothenbuch, Rothenbuch
 Burg Rothenfels, Rothenfels
 Ruine Schönrain, Gemünden am Main
 Schloss Weyberhöfe, Sailauf

Landkreis Miltenberg

 Schloss Amorbach, Amorbach
 Clingenburg, Klingenberg am Main
 Burg Collenberg, Collenberg
 Henneburg, Stadtprozelten
 Schloss Kleinheubach, Kleinheubach
 Burg Laudenbach, Laudenbach
 Mildenburg, Miltenberg
 Burg Wildenberg, Kirchzell
 Burg Wildenstein, Eschau

Landkreis Rhön-Grabfeld 

 Brennhausen Water Castle, Sulzdorf an der Lederhecke
 Schloss Kleinbardorf, Kleinbardorf
 Salzburg, Bad Neustadt an der Saale
 Irmelshausen, Höchheim
 Sternberg, Sulzdorf an der Lederhecke

Landkreis Schweinfurt 
 Schloss Vasbühl, Werneck
 Schloss Werneck, Werneck
 Zabelstein Castle, unincorporated area of Hundelshausen

Landkreis Würzburg 

 Brattenstein Castle, Röttingen
 Reichelsburg (ruins), Aub
 Schloss Veitshöchheim, Veitshöchheim

Regierungsbezirk Schwaben

Augsburg
 Herrenhaus Bannacker, Augsburg (Bannacker)
 Schloss Wellenburg, Augsburg (Wellenburg)

Kaufbeuren
 Burgruine Kemnat

Kempten (Allgäu)
 Burgruine Burghalde

Memmingen
 Schloss Eisenburg
 Schloss Grünenfurt
 Schloss Illerfeld

Landkreis Aichach-Friedberg
 Burgstall Bachern, Friedberg
 Burgstall Klingenberg, Aichach-Oberwittelsbach
 Schloss Friedberg, Friedberg
 Wasserschloss Unterwittelsbach, Aichach-Unterwittelsbach
 Burg Wittelsbach, Aichach-Oberwittelsbach

Landkreis Dillingen an der Donau
 Schloss Altenberg, Syrgenstein
 Schloss Bächingen, Bächingen an der Brenz
 Schloss Bissingen, Bissingen
 Bloßenstaufen Castle, Syrgenstein
 Burgruine Bocksberg, Laugna
 Schloss Dillingen, Dillingen an der Donau
 Schloss Glött, Glött
 Schloss Haunsheim, Haunsheim
 Schloss Höchstädt, Höchstädt an der Donau
 Burgruine Hohenburg, Bissingen
 Schloss Kalteneck, Schwenningen
 Schloss Lauingen, Lauingen (Donau)
 Schloss Oberbechingen, Oberbechingen
 Schloss Schlachtegg, Gundelfingen an der Donau
 Schloss Staufen, Syrgenstein
 Schloss Wertingen, Wertingen

Landkreis Donau-Ries
 Burgruine Alerheim, Alerheim
 Schloss Amerdingen, Amerdingen
 Schloss Genderkingen, Genderkingen
 Burg Gosheim in Gosheim, Gemeinde Huisheim, Reste der Burganlage in der Friedhofsmauer und Pfarrkirche
 Burgruine Graisbach in Graisbach, Gemeinde Marxheim
 Burg Harburg, Harburg (Schwaben)
 Altes Schloss Hemerten in Hemerten, Gemeinde Münster
 Neues Schloss Hemerten in Hemerten, Gemeinde Münster
 Schloss Hirschbrunn in Hirschbrunn, Gemeinde Auhausen
 Schloss Hochaltingen in Hochaltingen, Gemeinde Fremdingen
 Burgruine Hochhaus near Karlshof, Gemeinde Hohenaltheim
 Schloss Hohenaltheim, Hohenaltheim
 Schloss Kleinerdlingen in Kleinerdlingen, Stadt Nördlingen, ehem. Johanniterschloss
 Schloss Leitheim in Leitheim, Markt Kaisheim
 Schloss Lierheim in Lierheim, Gemeinde Möttingen, ehem. Deutschordensschloss
 Schloss Monheim, Monheim
 Burg Niederhaus in Niederhaus, Ederheim
 Schloss Oberndorf, Oberndorf am Lech
 Schloss Otting, Otting
 Schloss Oettingen, Oettingen in Bayern
 Altes Schloss Rain, Rain
 Schloss Reimlingen, Reimlingen, former Teutonic Knights' castle
 Schloss Schweinspoint in Schweinspoint, Gemeinde Marxheim
 Burgruine Steinhart in Steinhart, Gemeinde Hainsfarth
 Schloss Tagmersheim, Tagmersheim
 Schloss Tapfheim, Tapfheim
 Burgstall Thurneck in Thurneck, Gemeinde Mönchsdeggingen
 Altes Schloss Wallerstein, Wallerstein, remains of the site, viewing point
 Moritzschlösschen Wallerstein, Wallerstein
 Neues Schloss Wallerstein, Wallerstein
 Wellwart (Wöllwarth), Harburg (Schwaben), remains of a motte-and-bailey castle

Landkreis Günzburg
 Schloss Autenried, Ichenhausen
 Schloss Burgau, Burgau
 Schloss Burtenbach, Burtenbach
 Schloss Eberstall, Jettingen-Scheppach
 Schloss Edelstetten, Neuburg an der Kammel
 Schloss Großkötz, Kötz
 Schloss Günzburg, Günzburg
 Schloss Haldenwang, Haldenwang
 Oberes Schloss Ichenhausen, Ichenhausen
 Unteres Schloss Ichenhausen, Ichenhausen
 Schloss Jettingen, Jettingen-Scheppach
 Schloss Kleinkötz, Kötz
 Schloss Klingenburg, Jettingen-Scheppach
 Schloss Krumbach, Krumbach (Schwaben)
 ehemaliges Schloss Landstrost, Offingen
 Schloss Leipheim, Leipheim
 Schloss Neuburg, Neuburg an der Kammel
 Schloss Niederraunau, Krumbach (Schwaben)
 Burg Reisensburg, Günzburg
 Schloss Seifriedsberg, Ziemetshausen
 Schloss Unterknöringen, Burgau
 Schloss Waldstetten, Waldstetten

Landkreis Neu-Ulm
 Schloss Beuren, Pfaffenhofen an der Roth
 Schloss Hausen, Neu-Ulm
 Schloss Illereichen, Altenstadt
 Schloss Illertissen (so-called Vöhlinschloss), Illertissen
 Schloss Neubronn, Neu-Ulm
 Burgruine Neuhausen, Holzheim
 Schloss Obenhausen, Buch
 Schloss Osterberg, Osterberg
 Schloss Reutti, Neu-Ulm
 Altes Schloss Weißenhorn (so-called Fuggerschloss), Weißenhorn
 Neues Schloss Weißenhorn (so-called Rechbergschloss or even Neuffenschloss), Weißenhorn

Landkreis Ostallgäu

 Alt-Trauchburg Castle, Weitnau
 Schloss Bullachberg, Schwangau
 Eisenberg Castle, Eisenberg
 Falkenstein Castle, Pfronten
 Schloss Günzach, Günzach
 Helmishofen Castle, Kaltental
 Hohenfreyberg Castle, Eisenberg
 Schloss Hohenschwangau, Schwangau
 Hohes Schloss, Füssen
 Schloss Hopferau, Hopferau
 Schloss Lamerdingen, Lamerdingen
 Schloss Marktoberdorf, Marktoberdorf
 Nesselburg Castle, Nesselwang
 Schloss Neuschwanstein, Schwangau
 Schloss Osterzell, Osterzell
 Schloss Unterthingau, Unterthingau
 Schloss Waal, Waal
 Schloss Weizern, Hopferau

Landkreis Unterallgäu
 Schloss (Bürgermeister-Rabus-Straße 5), Memmingerberg
 Schloss (so called Rotes Schlößle, Am Roten Schlößle 2), Memmingerberg
 Schloss (so called  Wachterschlößle, Benninger Straße 8), Memmingerberg
 Altenschönegg Castle, Oberschönegg
 Schloss Babenhausen, Babenhausen
 Schloss Bedernau, Breitenbrunn
 Fuggerschloss Boos, Boos
 Schloss Fellheim, Fellheim
 Schloss Frickenhausen, Lauben
 Schloss Grönenbach, Bad Grönenbach
 Unteres Schloss Grönenbach, Bad Grönenbach
 Schloss Holzgünz, Holzgünz
 Schloss Kirchheim, Kirchheim in Schwaben
 Schloss Kronburg, Kronburg
 Schloss Künersberg, Memmingerberg
 Neues Schloss Lautrach, Lautrach
 Schloss Markt Wald, Markt Wald
 Schloss Mattsies, Tussenhausen
 Schloss Mindelburg, Mindelheim
 Burgruine Rothenstein, Bad Grönenbach
 Schloss Trunkelsberg, Trunkelsberg
 Schloss Türkheim, Türkheim
 Schloss Ungerhausen, Ungerhausen

See also
List of castles
List of castles in Germany

External links 
 Burgen und Schlösser in Bayern at burgeninventar.de

 
Bavaria